The 2015–2016 MRF Challenge Formula 2000 Championship was the fourth running of the MRF Challenge Formula 2000 Championship. It began on 31 October 2015 at Yas Marina Circuit, Abu Dhabi and finished on 31 January 2016 at the Madras Motor Racing Track, India. The series comprised 14 races, spread across four meetings, with the second round in Sakhir being a support event to the FIA World Endurance Championship.

Drivers

Race calendar and results
The second round in Bahrain was held in support of the FIA World Endurance Championship.

Championship standings

Scoring system

Drivers' standings

References

External links
 

2015-2016
MRF Challenge
MRF Challenge
MRF Challenge
MRF Challenge
MRF Challenge